The following is the 1963–64 network television schedule for the three major English language commercial broadcast networks in the United States. The schedule covers primetime hours from September 1963 through August 1964. The schedule is followed by a list per network of returning series, new series, and series cancelled after the 1962–63 season.

ABC began its new fall schedule a week early, beating CBS and NBC out of the starting gate. New series debuting this week included sci-fi anthology The Outer Limits, police/lawyer series Arrest and Trial, drama The Fugitive, and game show 100 Grand. ABC also completely revamped its Friday night schedule, with three new series: detective show Burke's Law, sitcom The Farmer's Daughter, and boxing program The Fight of the Week. Fight would mark the end of boxing on network television. Weekly boxing telecasts had debuted on network TV in 1940 and had enjoyed a run on all networks at various times, but after September 11, 1964, weekly primetime boxing series would disappear entirely from network television. ABC introduced two variety hours that fall with The Jimmy Dean Show and the short lived The Jerry Lewis Show.

CBS's success with rural comedies The Andy Griffith Show and The Beverly Hillbillies had convinced the network that rural sitcoms would continue to be popular. As a result, CBS president James Aubrey added what some critics described as an "endless procession of country clones [of] the wildly successful Beverly Hillbillies" to the network's schedule. Petticoat Junction, from the same producers of Hillbillies, debuted on September 24. CBS also brought two show business veterans to weekly variety television that year with Judy Garland and Danny Kaye.

Westerns continued to be popular on television, and all three networks scheduled several Western series. NBC, in particular, retained a number of Westerns on its fall 1963 schedule: two returning series The Virginian and Bonanza, and new series Temple Houston, and Redigo. NBC's Western-heavy schedule would pay off, as Bonanza again became the second highest-rated TV series in the Nielsen ratings that year; The Virginian reached #17. CBS's Gunsmoke reached #20.

On July 17, 1963, NBC removed The Robert Taylor Show from the lineup due to conflicts between the producers and the U.S. Department of Health, Education and Welfare.

All times are Eastern and Pacific. New fall series are highlighted in bold.

Each of the 30 highest-rated shows is listed with its rank and rating as determined by Nielsen Media Research.

This network TV season is also notable for being the season when the JFK Assassination took place on Friday, November 22, 1963. Many programs that were originally scheduled to air on that weekend on all three networks (and on the day of the assassination) on prime time had to be pushed back to the following weekend due to all three networks doing news coverage that would last until November 26.

This became a landmark TV season when The Beatles made their American debut on the Ed Sullivan Show on February 9, 1964. An estimated 73 million people tuned in to watch the Fab Four perform on the show, which made it one of the highest rated TV episodes in the history of prime time television.

 Yellow indicates the top 10 programs for the season.
 Cyan indicates the top 20 programs for the season.
 Magenta indicates the top 30 programs for the season.

Sunday 

Notes: Mister Ed aired on CBS from 6:30 to 7 p.m. 100 Grand only lasted three weeks, and was replaced by Laughs For Sale, which ran until December 1963. In April 1964, The Celebrity Game was added to CBS' primetime lineup. Empire on ABC consisted of reruns of the 1962-63 NBC TV series. Brenner on CBS consisted of ten new episodes — the first produced for the show since 1959 — followed by reruns of episodes first aired in 1959 and 1961.

Monday 

Note: Beginning in September, CBS Evening News with Walter Cronkite (formerly Walter Cronkite with the News) and The Huntley-Brinkley Report expanded to a half-hour, airing weekdays at 6:30 p.m

Tuesday 

Note: The 1964 CBS summer series High Adventure with Lowell Thomas consisted of reruns of specials which had aired under that title during the late 1950s. In January 1964, Redigo was cancelled and replaced with You Don't Say!.

Wednesday

Thursday 

Note: Ensign O'Toole on ABC consisted of reruns of the 1962-1963 NBC situation comedy. On NBC, The Robert Taylor Show was supposed to air at 7:30-8:30, but it was never aired and replaced by Temple Houston on the schedule at the last minute.

Friday 

Note:  77 Sunset Strip on ABC ended February 7, 1964, replaced the next week by Destry. On December 6, 1963, The Farmer's Daughter was put on another day and timeslot, and put The Price Is Right at 9:30pm.

Saturday 

Note: ABC-TV Presents: The Hollywood Palace debuted on January 4, 1964, replacing The Jerry Lewis Show.

By network

ABC

Returning Series
77 Sunset Strip
ABC News Reports
The Adventures of Ozzie and Harriet
The Avengers
Ben Casey
Combat!
The Donna Reed Show
The Fight of the Week
Hootenanny
The Lawrence Welk Show
Make That Spare
McHale's Navy
My Three Sons
The Price is Right
Wagon Train

New Series
100 Grand
Arrest and Trial
Breaking Point
Burke's Law
Channing
Destry *
The Edie Adams Show
The Farmer's Daughter
The Fugitive
The Greatest Show on Earth
The Hollywood Palace *
The Jerry Lewis Show
The Jimmy Dean Show
Laughs For Sale
Let's Make a Deal
The Outer Limits
The Patty Duke Show
Saga of Western Man
The Sid Caesar Show
The Travels of Jaimie McPheeters

Not returning from 1962–63:
Alcoa Premiere
Beany and Cecil
Bell and Howell Closeup
Cheyenne
The Dakotas
The Gallant Men
Going My Way
Hawaiian Eye
Howard K. Smith: News and Comment
I'm Dickens, He's Fenster
The Jetsons
Leave It to Beaver
Mr. Smith Goes to Washington
Naked City
Our Man Higgins
The Rifleman
The Roy Rogers and Dale Evans Show
Stoney Burke
The Untouchables
The Valiant Years

CBS

Returning Series
The Alfred Hitchcock Hour
The Andy Griffith Show
The Beverly Hillbillies
Brenner
Candid Camera
CBS Reports
The Danny Thomas Show
The Defenders
The Dick Van Dyke Show
The Ed Sullivan Show
The Garry Moore Show
Gunsmoke
High Adventure with Lowell Thomas
I've Got a Secret
The Jack Benny Show
The Jackie Gleason Show
Lassie
The Lucy Show
Mister Ed
The Nurses
Password
Perry Mason
Rawhide
Route 66
Suspense
To Tell the Truth
The Twentieth Century
Twilight Zone
Vacation Playhouse
What's My Line

New Series
Chronicle *
The Danny Kaye Show
East Side/West Side
Glynis
The Great Adventure
The Judy Garland Show
Made in America *
My Favorite Martian
The New Phil Silvers Show
On Broadway Tonight *
Petticoat Junction
Slattery's People
Summer Playhouse *
Tell It to the Camera *

Not returning from 1962–63:
Dennis the Menace
Eyewitness
Fair Exchange
Have Gun - Will Travel
GE True
The Keefe Brasselle Show
The Lloyd Bridges Show
The Many Loves of Dobie Gillis
The New Loretta Young Show
The Real McCoys
Stump the Stars
The United States Steel Hour
Walter Cronkite with the News

NBC

Returning Series
The Alfred Hitchcock Hour (moved from CBS)
The Andy Williams Show
The Bell Telephone Hour
Bonanza
Dr. Kildare
The DuPont Show of the Week
The Eleventh Hour
Hazel
International Showtime
The Jack Paar Program
The Joey Bishop Show
Perry Como's Kraft Music Hall
Sing Along with Mitch
NBC Monday Night at the Movies
NBC Saturday Night at the Movies
The Virginian
Walt Disney's Wonderful World of Color

New Series
Bob Hope Presents the Chrysler Theatre
Chrysler Presents a Bob Hope Special *
Espionage
Grindl
Harry's Girls
Hollywood and the Stars
Kraft Suspense Theatre
Mr. Novak
On Parade *
Redigo
The Richard Boone Show
Temple Houston
That Was the Week That Was *
You Don't Say! *

Not returning from 1962–63:
Car 54, Where Are You?
Chet Huntley Reporting
David Brinkley's Journal
The Dick Powell Show
Don't Call Me Charlie!
Du Pont Show of the Week
Empire
Ensign O’Toole
The Huntley–Brinkley Report
It's a Man's World
Laramie
The Lively Ones
Saints and Sinners
Sam Benedict
Wide Country

Note: The * indicates that the program was introduced in midseason.

References

 Castleman, H. & Podrazik, W. (1982). Watching TV: Four Decades of American Television. New York: McGraw-Hill. 314 pp.
 McNeil, Alex. Total Television. Fourth edition. New York: Penguin Books. .
 Brooks, Tim & Marsh, Earle (1984). The Complete Directory to Prime Time Network TV Shows (3rd ed.). New York: Ballantine. .

United States primetime network television schedules
1963 in American television
1964 in American television